Ecological Complexity is a quarterly peer-reviewed scientific journal covering the field of biocomplexity in the environment and theoretical ecology with special attention to papers that integrate natural and social processes at various spatio-temporal scales. The founding editor was Bai-Lian (Larry) Li (University of California at Riverside) and the current editor-in-chief is Sergei Petrovskii (University of Leicester).

External links 
 

Elsevier academic journals
Quarterly journals
Ecology journals
Publications established in 2004
English-language journals